Madeira Beach is a city in Pinellas County, Florida, United States, bordered on the west by the Gulf of Mexico, and on the east by St. Petersburg. As of the 2020 census, the population was 3,895.  Madeira Beach is known to be a quaint beach town that attracts affluent, preppy college students during the spring season. The entertainment district of John's Pass is located on the Intracoastal Waterway. The city is often referred to by locals as Mad Beach. It is named after the Portuguese island of Madeira.

Geography

The city is located on a barrier island between the Gulf of Mexico to the southwest, and Boca Ciega Bay to the northeast. One bridge, the Tom Stuart Causeway, connects Madeira Beach to the mainland, in the unincorporated community of Bay Pines. To the northwest of Madeira Beach is the town of Redington Beach, and to the southeast, across the inlet of John's Pass, is the city of Treasure Island.

Demographics

At the 2000 census, there were 4,511 people in 2,528 households, including 1,122 families, in the city. The racial makeup of the city was: 97.05% White, 0.27% African American, 0.31% Native American, 0.58% Asian, 0.04% Pacific Islander, 0.67% from other races, and 1.09% from two or more races. Hispanic or Latino of any race made up 2.37%.

Of the 2,528 households: 9.1% had children under the age of 18 living with them; 35.6% were married couples living together; 5.6% had a female householder with no husband present; and 55.6% were non-families. 42.4% of households were one person, and 12.2% were one person aged 65 or older. The average household size was 1.78, and the average family size was 2.36.

The age distribution was: 8.2% under the age of 18; 4.8% from 18 to 24; 29.3% from 25 to 44; 35.7% from 45 to 64; and 22.0% that are 65 or older. The median age was 48 years. For every 100 females, there were 111.3 males. For every 100 females age 18 and over, there were 110.2 males.

The median household income was $36,671, and the median family income was $50,833. Males had a median income of $32,353, versus $27,455 for females. The per capita income for the city was $30,097. About 4.1% of families and 9.8% of the population were below the poverty line, including 4.1% of those under age 18, and 12.2% of those age 65 or over.

Chicken Church

The Church by the Sea construction lasted from 1944 to 1946, has become a tourist attraction because it looks like a chicken; it is known colloquially as the "Chicken Church." 
Church By The Sea is a non-denominational Church serving the gulf beaches including Madeira Beach, Treasure Island, Redington, St. Pete Beach - as well as the cities of Seminole and St. Petersburg.

John's Pass Marina
On September 27, 1848, a strong hurricane struck the West Coast of Florida. It separated the barrier island on the coast and created a waterway known today as John's Pass. John Levique, along with Joseph Silva, was the one who discovered it and named it after himself and is now a federally owned canal.

In 2022, The Governor of Florida Ron DeSantis included in the budget $1,500,000 to dredge John's Pass.

See also

 Gulf Beaches Public Library

References

External links
 City of Madeira Beach official website

Cities in Pinellas County, Florida
Cities in Florida
Populated coastal places in Florida on the Gulf of Mexico
Beaches of Pinellas County, Florida
Beaches of Florida